The 2nd Critics' Choice Documentary Awards were presented on November 2, 2017, in Brooklyn, New York, honoring the finest achievements in documentary filmmaking and non-fiction television. The nominees were announced on October 11, 2017.

Winners and nominees

Films by multiple nominations and wins

The following films received multiple nominations:

The following films received multiple awards:

See also
90th Academy Awards
70th Primetime Emmy Awards

References

2017 film awards
Critics' Choice Documentary Awards